Graham Creek is a stream in the U.S. state of Oregon.  It is a tributary to the Rogue River.

Graham Creek was named in 1904 after Edwin Graham, a local farmer.

References

Rivers of Oregon
Rivers of Jackson County, Oregon